Ronald Rawson Rawson  (17 June 1892 – 30 March 1952) was an English heavyweight professional boxer, who won a gold medal in Boxing at the 1920 Summer Olympics for Great Britain.

Amateur boxing career
He was the ABA Heavyweight Champion of Great Britain in 1920 and 1921. In 1920 he won the Olympic Gold Medal in Antwerp in the heavyweight division (from 1920 to 1936 this was 79.38 kg/175 lb+), defeating Danish boxer Søren Petersen in the final.

Although he only boxed as an Amateur, he did meet the professional boxer Jack Bloomfield in a "supposed 'exhibition' bout at a charity show at the Brighton Pavilion", where he suffered a knockout defeat in round three.

Olympic results
1st round bye
Defeated Samuel Stewart (United States)
Defeated Xavier Eluère (France)
Defeated Søren Petersen (Denmark)

References

External links
 
 

1892 births
1952 deaths
People educated at Westminster School, London
Alumni of Trinity College, Cambridge
Heavyweight boxers
Olympic boxers of Great Britain
English Olympic medallists
Olympic gold medallists for Great Britain
Boxers at the 1920 Summer Olympics
British Army personnel of World War I
Royal Engineers officers
Military personnel from London
Royal Corps of Signals officers
20th-century British engineers
Place of birth missing
Recipients of the Military Cross
England Boxing champions
Olympic medalists in boxing
Medalists at the 1920 Summer Olympics
English male boxers